{{DISPLAYTITLE:C8H10O}}
The molecular formula C8H10O may refer to:

 Ethylphenols
 2-Ethylphenol
 3-Ethylphenol
 4-Ethylphenol
 Ethyl phenyl ether
 Methoxytoluenes (methylanisoles)
 Methylenomycin B
 Phenethyl alcohol (2-phenylethanol)
 1-Phenylethanol
 Xylenols
 2,3-Xylenol
 2,4-Xylenol
 2,5-Xylenol
 2,6-Xylenol
 3,4-Xylenol
 3,5-Xylenol